John Young Brown may refer to:

Politics
John Y. Brown (politician, born 1835) (1835–1904), United States representative from Kentucky and Governor of Kentucky from 1891 to 1895
John Y. Brown, Sr. (1900–1985), United States representative from Kentucky
John Y. Brown, Jr. (1933–2022), Governor of Kentucky from 1979 to 1983
John Young Brown III (born 1963), Secretary of State of Kentucky from 1996 to 2004

Others
John Brown (basketball, born 1951), American basketball player

See also
John Brown (disambiguation)
John Young (disambiguation)
Young Brown (disambiguation)
John (disambiguation)
Young (disambiguation)
Brown (disambiguation)